This is a list of seasons completed by the Bossier-Shreveport Battle Wings. The Battle Wings are a professional arena football franchise of the Arena Football League (AFL), based in Bossier City, Louisiana. The team was established in 2001 as a member of arenafootball2 (AF2). Prior to 2004 the team was known as the Bossier City Battle Wings. In the final three years that AF2 was active, the Battle Wings made the playoffs, but never appeared in an ArenaCup championship. Following the completion of the 2009 season, AF2 effectively dissolved. During that season, the AFL had suspended operations, however when the AFL relaunched the Battle Wings were announced as a charter member, beginning play in April 2010.

Prior to the  season, the franchise was relocated to New Orleans, Louisiana, becoming the resurrected New Orleans VooDoo.

References
General

Specific

Bossier–Shreveport Battle Wings
Arena Football League seasons by team
Bossier–Shreveport Battle Wings seasons